Nüvədi (also, Nyuady and Nyuvedi) is a village and municipality in the Lerik Rayon of Azerbaijan.  It has a population of 384.  The municipality consists of the villages of Nüvədi and Rəzəvül.

References 

Populated places in Lerik District